February 2018

See also

References 

killings by law enforcement officers
 02